Chevoor is a census town in Thrissur district in the Indian state of Kerala. Chevvoor, or Chovvur as it is called in the Indian postal department, is 9 km from Thrissur city in the route Thrissur-Irinjalakuda/Kodungallor/Thriprayar. It is a little hillock surrounded by paddy fields. The name Chevvoor could have been derived from the fact that this place was developed, with levelled roads and living areas (Chovvulla Ur in Malayalam means straightened place).

Demographics
 Indian census, Chevvoor had a population of 17,373. Males constitute 48% of the population and females 52%. Chevvoor has an average literacy rate of 84%, higher than the national average of 59.5%; with male literacy of 86% and female literacy of 82%. Eleven percent of the population is under 6 years of age.

Chevoor is 9 km away from Thrissur town. It is approx. 17-18 km away from Irinjalakuda and Thriprayar. The nearest railway station is at Ollur and Pudukkad respectively. There are various bus routes both KSRTC and private running through Chevoor.

Bus Routes

 Thrissur - (via Cherpu) Thriprayar
 Thrissur - (via Cherpu - Urakam - Ettumana) Thriprayar
 Thrissur - (via Cherpu) - Kattur
 Thrissur - (via Urakam) - Arratupuzha
 Thrissur - (via Urakam) - Irinjalakuda
 Thrissur - (via Urakam) - Irinjalakuda - Mala
 Thrissur - (via Urakam) - Irinjalakuda - Mathilakam
 Thrissur - (via Urakam) - Irinjalakuda - Kodungaloor (KSRTC - LS and Private)
 Thrissur - (via Urakam) - Irinjalakuda - Kodungaloor - Paravur - Ernakulam
 Thiruvilwamala - Thrissur - (via Urakam) - Irinjalakuda - Kodungaloor
 Ottapalam - Thrissur - (via Urakam) - Irinjalakuda - Kodungaloor
 Palakkad - Thrissur - (via Urakam) - Irinjalakuda - Kodungaloor

The Furniture Hub

Chevoor has had a long legacy of being a key hub of the furniture trade in South India. The furniture business of Chevoor is more than 100 years old. Almost all houses here own a manufacturing unit and a showroom. More than 10,000 workers are associated with the furniture business in Chevoor. Rose Wood and Teak Wood are mainly used here and all types of furniture are available hear.

Educational institutions

Schools

St. Xavier’s High School, Chevoor
 CALPS Lower Primary School, Chevoor

Religion

Churches in Chevoor 

 St. Francis Xavier’s Church, Chevoor
 Sacred Heart Church, Perinchery, Chevoor
 St. Xavier's Chapel, Chevoor
 St. Mary’s Chapel, Chevoor
 St. Antony’s Chapel, Chevoor

Temples in Chevoor 

 Sree Mahalakshmi Temple, Chevoor
 Sree Narasimha Moorthy Temple, Karipperi Mana, Chevoor
 Keezhthrikkovil Temple, Chevoor
 Parthasaradhi Temple, Pathanapuram, Chevoor
 Madathil Temple, Perinchery Madam Temple Rd, Chevoor
 Kuttikattuparambil Rudhiramala temple, Chevoor
 Kudakuthykavvu temple, Chevoor

References

Further reading 
Official Website of Chevoor St. Francis Xavier’s Church

Cities and towns in Thrissur district
Indian furniture